Tebe Dorgu (born 2 August 1974) is a Nigerian wrestler. He competed in the men's freestyle 57 kg at the 1992 Summer Olympics.

References

1974 births
Living people
Nigerian male sport wrestlers
Olympic wrestlers of Nigeria
Wrestlers at the 1992 Summer Olympics
Place of birth missing (living people)
Commonwealth Games bronze medallists for Nigeria
Commonwealth Games medallists in wrestling
Wrestlers at the 2002 Commonwealth Games
20th-century Nigerian people
21st-century Nigerian people
Medallists at the 2002 Commonwealth Games